Pandemis cinnamomeana is a moth of the family Tortricidae. It is found from Europe (except in the south) to Russia, China (Heilongjiang, Jilin, Shanxi, Shaanxi, Sichuan, Jiangxi, Hubei, Hunan, Yunnan), Korea and Japan.

The wingspan is 18–24 mm. Adults are on wing from the end of June to July in western Europe. In Korea, adults are on wing from mid-May to mid-September. They hide during the day, usually among the foliage of large trees but sometimes showing a preference for tall bracken.

The larvae feed on the foliage of Abies alba, Acer, Betula, Larix, Malus pumila, Picea sitchensis, Prunus, Pyrus, Quercus, Salix, Sorbus aucuparia, Sorbus commixta, Ulmus davidiana and Vaccinium. It has also been recorded from Camellia. They live amongst spun leaves. Young larvae hibernate, development continues in May and June. Pupation occurs in June and July, in the larval habitation.

The larvae have been recorded attacking tea plantations, as well as forest and ornamental crops, but it is of minor economic importance.

References

Pandemis
Moths of Japan
Moths of Europe